Love and Bullets may refer to:

Love and Bullets (1914 film), directed by and starring Roscoe "Fatty" Arbuckle
Love and Bullets (1979 film), directed by Stuart Rosenberg and starring Charles Bronson
Ammore e malavita, 2017 Italian film